Golden Rail Motel is the third studio album by American singer-songwriter Eamon. It was released on September 15, 2017, by Huey Ave Music. Recording sessions for the album took place between 2016 and 2017 at The Lion's Den and The Space Ship Studios in Los Angeles, California. Golden Rail Motel contains themes of struggle, insanity, redemption, and love, and features a fusion of R&B and traditional soul music, along with elements of pop and hip hop music.

Golden Rail Motel was released to critical acclaim, with one review describing the record as "perfectly placed to slot into the retro-soul ranks", and another saying it is "a declaration that Eamon is here to stay." The run-up single to the record, "I Got Soul", featured a well-received one-shot music video directed by film director Douglas Quill.

Background 
After experiencing worldwide success with his hit single "Fuck It (I Don't Want You Back)" (2003), Eamon succumbed to the pitfalls of fame and fortune, namely drug abuse and addiction for several years following the release of his second album Love & Pain. Eamon, however, was able to recover from his addiction and in 2012 signed a recording contract with an independent label based out of San Francisco whom he recorded an album's worth of material for. The record was shelved after the label went bankrupt and its CFO was convicted of fraud and sentenced to 45 years in federal prison.

Eamon continued to write and record music. After featuring on a few Jedi Mind Tricks songs, the rap group's producer, Stoupe reached out to Eamon to record vocals for a producer's album he was working on. Both Stoupe and his record label were so pleased with the outcome, they decided to team up to produce the album that would become Golden Rail Motel.

Critical reception 

Golden Rail Motel was met with positive reviews from critics. The Canadian publication Exclaim! wrote that the album "showcases an artist in ripening maturity conquering his demons." In a four-star review, the British newspaperThe Independent singled out Eamon's vocal abilities as the "most impressive" aspect of the album. The album was further praised for its honesty, intensity, and grit.

Track listing

Personnel

Musicians
Eamon – vocals, production
Stoupe – drums
Dan Ubick – guitars and Hammond organ
Snipe Young – drums, percussion, bass, Hammond organ, Fender Rhodes
Jake Najor – drums
Dave Wilder – bass
Connie Price – percussion
David Ralicke – baritone and tenor saxophone
Jordan Katz – trumpet, valve trombone, flugelhorn
James King – baritone and tenor saxophone
Dan Hastie – piano
Chandler S. Dandridge – piano and Wurlitzer electric piano
Benj Heard – piano, percussion
Steve Kaye – bass guitar, violin, viola, cello
D'Wayne Kelly – Hammond organ
Ish Quintero – clavichord
Jeff Babko – vibraphone on bonus track
Sean Hurley – bass guitar on bonus track
Michael Ward – guitar on bonus track
Dave Palmer – piano, farfisa, and Hammond organ on bonus track
Brian S. Carr – accordion on bonus track

Jonathan Weber – violin on track 6
Edward Paid – violin on track 6
Francis Birchall – violin on track 6
Bianica Beliankina – violin on track 6
Derek Crowley – viola on track 6
Joshua Bremer – viola on track 6
Michael Kling – cello on track 6
Sarah Thiele – piano on track 10
Luis Conte – percussion on track 10, percussion and timpani on bonus track
Josefina Vergara – violin on track 10 and bonus track
Ashoka Thiagarajan – violin on track 10 and bonus track
Chung-Mei Chang – violin on track 10 and bonus track
Lisa Liu – violin on track 10 and bonus track
Caroline Buckman – viola on track 10 and bonus track
Luke Maurer – viola on track 10 and bonus track
Victor Lawrence – cello on track 10 and bonus track
Ginger Murphy – cello on track 10 and bonus track
Bart Samolis – double bass on track 10 and bonus track
Geoffrey Osika – double bass on track 10 and bonus track
Bill Churchville – trumpet on track 10
Eric Jorgensen – trombone on track 10
Steve Marsh – tenor saxophone on track 10
Terry Landry – baritone saxophone on track 10

Production

Eamon – production on all tracks, horn arrangements on tracks 1, 4, 5, and 9
Stoupe – production on tracks 2, 3, 4, 5, 7, 8, 9
Dan Ubick – production on tracks 1, 2, 3, 4, 5, 7, 8, 9, horn arrangements on tracks 1, 3, 4, 5, 7, and 9
Snipe Young – production on tracks 1, 2, 7, 8, vocal production on tracks 1-9, horn arrangements on tracks 2
Steve Kay – mixing on all tracks, additional production on tracks 4 and 6

Dave Cooley – mastering on all tracks
Mikal Blue – production and vocal production on track 10 and bonus track
Benj Heard – production on track 6, additional production on track 10, string and horn arrangements on tracks 6, 10, and bonus track
Andrew Williams – string and horn arrangements on track 10 and bonus track

Creative

Vinnie Paz – executive producer
Ryan "Yan" Donahue – executive producer, A&R
DJ U-VEX – A&R

Dan Bradley – album packaging design and layout
Mike McRath – cover photo
Pic Van Exel – liner notes photo

References

2017 albums
Eamon (singer) albums